Adam Ptáčník (born 4 December 1985 in Pardubice) is a Czech amateur track cyclist. He shared the men's sprint title with Tomáš Bábek and Denis Špička at the Czech Track Cycling Championships, and later represented the Czech Republic at the 2008 Summer Olympics. Ptacnik also won two bronze medals each in Keirin and team sprint at the 2005 European Junior Championships in Fiorenzuola, Italy.

Ptacnik qualified for the Czech squad in two track cycling events at the 2008 Summer Olympics in Beijing by receiving one of the team's three available berths based on UCI's selection process from the Track World Rankings. In the men's team sprint, held on the first day of the program, Ptacnik and his teammates Babek and Spicka battled in an opening heat against the U.S. trio of Michael Blatchford, Giddeon Massie, and Adam Duvendeck with an eleventh-place time in 45.678 and an average speed of 59.109 km/h, failing to advance further to the top eight match round. Two days later, in the men's sprint, Ptacnik narrowly missed out the round-of-sixteen matchup by a four-thousandth second margin on the morning prelims in 10.569, finishing nineteenth overall in the process.

At the 2010 European Track Championships in Pruszków, Poland, Ptacnik overhauled the French duo François Pervis and Michael D'Almeida on the final stretch to grab the bronze medal in men's Keirin.

Career highlights

2003
  European Junior Championships (Team sprint), Moscow (RUS)
2005
  Czech Track Cycling Championships (1 km time trial), Prague (CZE)
  Czech Track Cycling Championships (Sprint), Prague (CZE)
  European Junior Championships (Keirin), Fiorenzuola (ITA)
  European Junior Championships (Team sprint), Fiorenzuola (ITA)
  Stage 1, UCI World Cup (1 km time trial), Moscow (RUS)
2008
  Czech Track Cycling Championships (Team sprint with Tomáš Bábek and Denis Špička), Brno (CZE)
 11th Olympic Games (Team sprint with Tomáš Bábek and Denis Špička), Beijing (CHN)
 19th Olympic Games (Sprint), Beijing (CHN)
2010
  European Championships (Keirin), Pruszków (POL)
 12th UCI World Championships (Team sprint), Copenhagen (DEN)
 26th UCI World Championships (Keirin), Copenhagen (DEN)
 33rd UCI World Championships (Sprint), Copenhagen (DEN)
2011
  Czech Track Cycling Championships (Team sprint), Prague (CZE)
  Czech Track Cycling Championships (Sprint), Prague (CZE)
  Czech Track Cycling Championships (Keirin), Prague (CZE)
2013
  Czech Track Cycling Championships (Keirin), Brno (CZE)

References

External links
 NBC Olympics Profile
 
 

1985 births
Living people
Czech male cyclists
Czech track cyclists
Cyclists at the 2008 Summer Olympics
Cyclists at the 2016 Summer Olympics
Olympic cyclists of the Czech Republic
Sportspeople from Pardubice